The 2009 Malaysia Open Grand Prix Gold was the inaugural edition of the Malaysia Open Grand Prix Gold and fourth grand prix's badminton tournament of the 2009 BWF Grand Prix Gold and Grand Prix. The tournament was held at the Bandaraya Stadium in Johor Bahru, Malaysia from 23 to 28 June 2009 and had a total purse of $120,000.

Men's singles

Seeds

 Lee Chong Wei (champion)
 Taufik Hidayat (first round)
 Chetan Anand (first round)
 Lee Tsuen Seng (third round)
 Kenichi Tago (quarter-finals)
 Andre Kurniawan Tedjono (quarter-finals)
 Andrew Smith (second round)
 Wong Choong Hann (semi-finals)
 Arvind Bhat (third round)
 Sairul Amar Ayob (first round)
 Rajiv Ouseph (third round)
 Kashyap Parupalli (second round)
 Muhammad Hafiz Hashim (first round)
 Kuan Beng Hong (third round)
 Carl Baxter (second round)
 Anup Sridhar (first round)

Finals

Women's singles

Seeds

 Pi Hongyan (semi-finals)
 Saina Nehwal (quarter-finals)
 Zhu Lin (second round)
 Wong Mew Choo (semi-finals)
 Juliane Schenk (quarter-finals)
 Ai Goto (second round)
 Xing Aiying (quarter-finals)
 Lydia Cheah Li Ya (second round)

Finals

Men's doubles

Seeds

 Markis Kido / Hendra Setiawan (withdrew)
 Koo Kien Keat / Tan Boon Heong (champion)
 Mohd Zakry Abdul Latif / Mohd Fairuzizuan Mohd Tazari (quarter-finals)
 Chris Adcock / Robert Blair (second round)
 Hendra Aprida Gunawan / Alvent Yulianto (semi-finals)
 Chen Zhiben / Shen Ye (first round)
 Sun Junjie / Tao Jiaming (quarter-finals)
 Hendri Kurniawan Saputra / Hendra Wijaya (second round)

Finals

Women's doubles

Seeds

 Chin Eei Hui / Wong Pei Tty (final)
 Shinta Mulia Sari / Yao Lei (second round)
 Pan Pan / Tian Qing (second round)
 Nicole Grether /  Charmaine Reid (second round)

Finals

Mixed doubles

Seeds

 Valiyaveetil Diju / Jwala Gutta (quarter-finals)
 Zheng Bo / Ma Jin (champion)
 Xu Chen / Zhao Yunlei (final)
 Chris Adcock / Gabrielle White (second round)
 Koo Kien Keat / Ng Hui Lin (second round)
 Flandy Limpele /  Anastasia Russkikh (quarter-finals)
 Lim Khim Wah / Amelia Alicia Anscelly (second round)
 Chan Peng Soon / Goh Liu Ying (first round)

Finals

References

External links 
 Tournament link

Malaysia Masters
Malaysia
Malaysia Open Grand Prix Gold
Sport in Johor
Johor Bahru